Marianne Bastid-Bruguière is a French sinologist.

Biography
Marianne Bastid-Bruguière was born on 13 November 1940. She is a graduate of the Ecole Nationale des Langues et Civilisations Orientales and Peking University. From 1969, she has worked for the Centre National de la Recherche Scientifique. She has also taught at the Institut d'études politiques de Strasbourg, the École des hautes études en sciences sociales, Paris Diderot University, Harvard University, Seikei University, the University of London, and the University of Kyoto. She is a reader for The China Quarterly.

She is a member of the Académie des Sciences Morales et Politiques, the Society for Asian Studies, the Academia Europaea. From 1992 to 1996, she was President of the Association Européenne d'Etudes Chinoises. She has received honorary PhDs from the Russian Academy of Sciences and the University of Aberdeen. In April 2010, she was named Grand Officer of the Légion d'honneur.

Bibliography
La Chine 1: Des Guerres de l'Opium à la Guerre Franco-Chinoise, 1840-1885  (co-written with J. Chesneaux) (1965)
Aspects de la Réforme de l'Enseignement en Chine au Début du XXe siècle (1971)
La Chine 2: De la Guerre Franco-Chinoise à la Fondation du Parti Communiste Chinois, 1885-1921 (co-written with J. Chesneau and M.-C. Bergère) (1972)
L'Evolution de la Société Chinoise à la Fin de la Dynastie des Qing, 1873-1911 (1979)
The Cambridge History of China (co-author) (1980)
The Scope of State Power in China (co-author) (1985)
China's Education and the Industrialized world; Studies in Cultural Transfer (co-written with R. Hayhoe) (1987)
Educational Reform in Early Twentieth-Century China (translated by P.J. Bailey) (1988)

References

Writers from Paris
1940 births
Living people
Peking University alumni
Academic staff of the University of Paris
Academics of the University of London
Harvard University faculty
Historians of China
Grand Officiers of the Légion d'honneur
Members of the Académie des sciences morales et politiques
Academic staff of Sciences Po
INALCO alumni
French sinologists
French women scientists
Members of Academia Europaea
Women orientalists